Ajara or Adjara may refer to:
Ajara (India), town in Maharashtra, India
Adjara, autonomous republic of Georgia